Lycaena mariposa, the mariposa copper, is a butterfly of the family Lycaenidae. It is found in western Canada and the United States.

The wingspan is 23–28 mm. Adults are on wing from mid-July to August.

The larvae feed on Vaccinium arbuscula and Polygonum douglasii.

Subspecies
 Lycaena mariposa penroseae 
 Lycaena mariposa charlottensis

References

mariposa
Butterflies of North America
Taxa named by Tryon Reakirt
Butterflies described in 1866